The  are a Japanese professional basketball team. Following the team's establishment in 2010, they participated in the Eastern Conference of the bj league for five seasons and in 2013 became the first team based in the Kanto region of Japan to win the league's championship. From September 2016 the team will compete in the first division of the new professional basketball league.

History

Early success in bj league (2011-13)
The B-Corsairs entered the league in the 2011-2012 season as one of four expansion teams, seeing the league grow from 16 to 20 teams. In their first season they finished in second place in the Eastern Conference, led by league MVP Justin Burrell. Former NBA player Reggie Geary won the coach of the year award. In the playoff series they finished third overall, losing the Eastern Conference Final to the Hamamatsu Higashimikawa Phoenix but defeating the Kyoto Hannaryz in the playoff for third.

The following season the B-Corsairs won the 2012-13 bj-league title, defeating Rizing Fukuoka in the championship game. After again finishing second in the Eastern Conference, they overcame conference leader Niigata Albirex BB in the Eastern Conference Final, with Draelon Burns scoring in the final second of the game. With the victory, Geary became the first foreign-born coach to win a title in the bj-league. Team captain Masayuki Kabaya was named playoff MVP.

Descent from playoff contention (2013-2016)
The club's initial success came at a financial cost. In the off-season following their championship success, it was reported that the club was in financial difficulty and the ownership changed. Geary left the club to join the Chiba Jets and the B-Corsairs' import players also signed with other clubs within Japan. Geary's assistant Michael Katsuhisa became head coach and Taketo Aoki retired as a player to become an assistant coach. Import players Wayne Marshall, Marquise Gray and Omar Reed joined the club. The 2013-14 season started reasonably well for the club, which was in playoff contention with a 16-17 record, but it slumped at the end of the year and finished with a 24-28 record, missing out on the playoffs for the first time.

Katsuhisa remained as head coach for the 2014-15 season and the team was again led by Kabaya and Marshall. Dzaflo Larkai, Carl Hall and Warren Niles were added as import players. Kenji Yamada was named captain although Kabaya remained with the team. The club struggled throughout the season however, with Marshall missing a quarter of the season due to injury. They finished to 10th place in the Eastern Conference with an 18-34 win–loss record.

At the end of the 2014-15 season Katsuhisa left the club and Aoki became the head coach. Marshall left the club and was replaced by Jordan Henriquez. Cory Johnson and Emanuel Willis were also added to the roster, although Willis was released six games into the 2015-16 season. Yamada continued in the role of team captain for the second season. Satoshi Hisayama, who had been at the club since its beginning in 2011 but was released at the end of the 2014-15 season, returned to the club at the end of October to replace Willis. Small forward Ryoichi Ishitani, who had been with the B-Corsairs training squad since the 2014-15 season, including a previous stint on the main squad between November 2014 and February 2015, was signed to a full contract and added to the main squad in February 2016. After recording a 16-14 win–loss record in the first four months of the season, the team slumped to manage just two wins in its next twenty games. The team finished the season in 10th place in the Eastern Conference for the second consecutive year. At the end of the season the club announced that it would not renew the contracts of Hall and Johnson.

B.League 
From September 2016 the B-Corsairs will compete in the Central Conference of the First Division of the B.League, a new three-division competition formed from the merger of the bj-league and the National Basketball League. During the off-season Hisayama, who had been with the club since their foundation, announced his retirement as a player, and joined the Shimane Susanoo Magic as a coach under Katsuhisa. Yamada was named as team captain for his third year. Off-season signings included free agents Jeff Parmer (previously with Shiga) and Faye Pape Mour (previously with Niigata), as well as American Jason Washburn, who was previously playing in the Kosovo league in Europe.

Record by season

Players

Current roster

Individual awards
League MVP:
Justin Burrell (2011–12)
Playoff MVP:
Masayuki Kabaya (2012–13)
League Best Five:
Justin Burrell (2011–12)
Draelon Burns (2012–13)

All-Star selections
Justin Burrell (2011–12)
Draelon Burns (2012–13)
Masayuki Kabaya (2013–14)

Notable players

 Justin Burrell
 Paul Butorac
Robert Carter 
 Jordan Henriquez
 Masashi Hosoya
 Cory Johnson
 Takuya Kawamura
 Dzaflo Larkai
 Khyle Marshall
 Will McDonald
 Chas McFarland
 Alexis Minatoya
 Marcus Simmons
 Hasheem Thabeet
 Jason Washburn
 Kenji Yamada

Head coaches

Arenas

Yokohama International Swimming Pool
Yokohama Cultural Gymnasium, Yokohama United Arena
Tokkei Security Hiratsuka General Gymnasium

Practice facilities
The team practices at the Takigashira Kaikan in Isogo, Yokohama.

References

External links

 
Basketball teams in Japan
Sports teams in Kanagawa Prefecture
Basketball teams established in 2010
2010 establishments in Japan